Miran Burgić (born 25 September 1984) is a former Slovenian footballer.

Career

In the 2005–06 season, while playing for Gorica, Burgič was the top goalscorer of the Slovenian League with 24 goals in 35 games. At that time he was a prospect for French, Swiss and German clubs. However, Burgić signed for AIK in the summer of 2006. In his home debut he scored two goals against Östers IF. Immediately he showed great ability to score in the penalty area with both feet and headers. Due to two severe knee injuries he did not reach his top level during his spell in Sweden.

During the summer 2008 when Burgič was back after injury he scored several goals and was close to a transfer to Greek side AEK Athens. However, he was stopped by then manager Rikard Norling, who considered him crucial for the team. After the 2008 season Norling got the sack and was replaced by Mikael Stahre. Burgič got the first half of the season destroyed by a knee-injury, and after his recovery he was not considered first choice among the strikers. In the same year the club won the title for the first time in eleven years, but Burgic only did nine appearances, including being substituted lately in the decisive game against IFK Göteborg where the club secured the title.

After the 2009 season Burgič wanted a new challenge and decided to not extend his contract that was about to expire in the summer of 2010. At the same time he was aspiring for a place in the Slovene national team that was about to participate in the World Cup. The club faced a tough campaign and had to fight to avoid relegation, and despite only playing occasionally, Burgič managed to score five goals, including two against Kalmar FF in a 3-0-win. In his last game for AIK, which was also the club's last game before the break for the World Cup, he scored a hat-trick in the club's 4-1-win against Åtvidaberg.

Despite not playing regularly during the spring of 2010, Burgič was on the verge to break into the Slovenian squad that participated in the World Cup, and was included in the initial 30-man squad. However, he did not make the final cut.

Shortly after it was announced that he had signed a contract with Austrian side Wacker Innsbruck on a free transfer. In the Austrian club he got somewhat of a new role, where he acted more of a second-striker.

In summer 2012 Burgič left Wacker Innsbruck since the club's finances were in terrible state. He later signed for Israeil side Hapoel Ramat Gan in the Israeli Premier League.

Honours

Club
ND Gorica
Slovenian Championship: 2003–04, 2004–05, 2005–06

AIK
 Allsvenskan: 2009
 Svenska Cupen: 2009
 Supercupen: 2010

Hapoel Ramat Gan
Israel State Cup: 2013

Individual
Slovenian First Football League Top Scorer: 2006

References
Player profile at PrvaLiga 
Player profile at AIK 
Player profile at Svensk Fotboll 

1984 births
Living people
People from Trbovlje
Slovenian footballers
Association football forwards
ND Gorica players
Slovenian PrvaLiga players
Slovenian expatriate footballers
Expatriate footballers in Sweden
Allsvenskan players
AIK Fotboll players
Expatriate footballers in Austria
Slovenian expatriate sportspeople in Austria
FC Wacker Innsbruck (2002) players
Expatriate footballers in Israel
Slovenian expatriate sportspeople in Israel
Israeli Premier League players
Cypriot First Division players
Hapoel Ramat Gan F.C. players
Expatriate footballers in Cyprus
Slovenian expatriate sportspeople in Cyprus
Ethnikos Achna FC players
NK Olimpija Ljubljana (2005) players
Slovenia under-21 international footballers
Slovenia international footballers
Slovenia youth international footballers